Martin Luther's Birth House is a building and museum in Eisleben, Germany. The German religious reformer Martin Luther was born there in 1483. However, the actual house in which Luther was born no longer exists, it having been burnt completely to the ground in 1689. A new building was built on the original site and was opened to the public in 1693, although it did not adhere to the original floor plan and size of the former house. An excavation was carried out in 2006, revealing pottery sherds and a clay floor from the original house.

In 1996, Luther's birth house became a UNESCO World Heritage Site along with the house where he died and other sites associated with Luther in Wittenberg because of their religious significance and their testimony to one of the most influential figures in medieval Europe. In 2005-2007 an expansion was added for visitors (project: Springer Architekten, Berlin); the ensemble has since received five architectural awards.

References

External links 
 Die Stiftung Luthergedenkstätten in Sachsen-Anhalt
 Deutsche Stiftung Denkmalschutz
 Lutherstiftung
 3D-Modell Luther's Birth House
 Chronological catalog of Luther's life events, letters, and works with citations, 478 pages, 5.45 MB LettersLuther4.doc

Martin Luther
Eisleben
Museums established in 1693
Luther
Historic house museums in Germany
Literary museums in Germany
World Heritage Sites in Germany
Rebuilt buildings and structures in Germany
Buildings and structures in Mansfeld-Südharz
1693 establishments in the Holy Roman Empire
Birthplaces of individual people